Mezzo Cammin is a semiannual online literary journal devoted to formalist poetry by contemporary women as well as to bring attention back to work that was more famous in previous eras. The journal's title comes from Judith Moffett's poem "Mezzo Cammin", which in turn takes its title from the opening line of the famous Italian poet Dante Alighieri's Inferno.  The journal is currently associated with the West Chester University Poetry Conference. The editor in chief is Kim Bridgford. Its advisory board consists of well-known poets such as Annie Finch, Allison Joseph, Marilyn Nelson, and Molly Peacock.

History
The first issue of the journal came out in the summer of 2006. It was created in response to "the tendency that still persists in academia of choosing the work of male poets to define a given era or literary style".

Mezzo Cammin emerged from community of women poets at the West Chester University Poetry Conference. The magazine was also affiliated with Fairfield University early on. In 2010, Kim Bridgford, Mezzo Cammin'''s editor in chief, became the director of the WCU Poetry Center in 2010. The magazine affirmed its link with West Chester in its Fifth Anniversary Issue.

Women Poets Timeline Project
Launched on March 27  at the National Museum of Women in the Arts in Washington, DC, the Mezzo Cammin'' Women Poets Timeline Project is expected to become the world's largest database of women poets. The date of the launch was symbolically chosen to be at the end of Women's History Month, just before National Poetry Month.

The database started out with information about 15 women poets, which will be expanded over time. The project will include biographical article of the poets, including photographs and reprints of their work when possible. One of the early challenges of the project has been the obtaining of copyright permission for the republishing of works online.

See also
New Formalism, the movement to revive formalism in poetry
New Formalist, a literary journal devoted to all formalist poetry

References

External links
 

American literature websites
Biannual magazines published in the United States
Magazines established in 2006
Magazines published in Pennsylvania
Online literary magazines published in the United States
Poetry magazines published in the United States